Himachal Seb Utpadak Sangh ('Himachal Apple Growers Union') is a farmers organization in the Indian state of Himachal Pradesh. The organization is opposed to neoliberalism. As of 2013, Rakesh Singha is the president of the organization. As of 2012, its secretary was Sanjay Chauhan.

The organization was founded at a convention in Shimla on 14 May 2011, with participation from farmers from Shimla district, Kullu district, Mandi district and Kinnaur district.

References

Farmers' organizations
Organisations based in Himachal Pradesh
Organizations established in 2011
2011 establishments in Himachal Pradesh
Horticultural organisations based in India
Apple production
Agriculture in Himachal Pradesh